is a UCI ProTeam founded in 2011 and based in Belgium. It participates in UCI Continental Circuits races.

Team roster

Major wins

2011
Kattekoers, Jonas van Genechten
Zellik–Galmaarden, Gaëtan Bille
Stage 2 Rhône-Alpes Isère Tour, Gaëtan Bille
Stage 3 Ronde de l'Oise, Gaëtan Bille
2012
Zellik–Galmaarden, Kevin Thomé
Grote 1-MeiPrijs, Christophe Prémont
2013
Ronde van Limburg, Olivier Chevalier
Stage 3b Tour of Szeklerland, Fabio Polazzi
2014
Tour du Finistère, Antoine Demoitié
2015
Stage 4 Circuit des Ardennes, Antoine Demoitié
Overall Tour de Bretagne, Sébastien Delfosse
2016
Overall Istrian Spring Trophy, Olivier Pardini
Overall Tour de Normandie, Baptiste Planckaert
Stage 2, Olivier Pardini
Stage 5, Baptiste Planckaert
Overall Circuit des Ardennes, Olivier Pardini
Stage 3, Olivier Pardini
Tour du Finistère, Baptiste Planckaert
Polynormande, Baptiste Planckaert
Stage 4 Czech Cycling Tour, Baptiste Planckaert
2017 
Stage 1 Tour La Provence, Justin Jules
La Drôme Classic, Sébastien Delfosse
Stage 4 Tour de Normandie, Justin Jules
Stage 1 Circuit de la Sarthe, Justin Jules
Stage 3 Circuit des Ardennes, Maxime Vantomme
Grand Prix de la ville de Pérenchies, Roy Jans
2018
Grand Prix de Denain, Kenny Dehaes
Stage 1 Circuit de la Sarthe, Justin Jules
Grand Prix de la ville de Pérenchies, Kenny Dehaes
2019
Stage 1a Settimana Internazionale di Coppi e Bartali, Emīls Liepiņš
Stage 4 Settimana Internazionale di Coppi e Bartali, Ludovic Robeet
Stage 1 Vuelta a Aragón, Justin Jules
Rund um Köln, Baptiste Planckaert
2021
Stage 2 Étoile de Bessèges, Timothy Dupont
Nokere Koerse, Ludovic Robeet
Stage 3 CRO Race, Milan Menten
2022
Grand Prix de la Ville de Lillers, Milan Menten
Stage 4 ZLM Tour, Timothy Dupont
2023
Stage 6 La Tropicale Amissa Bongo, Karl Patrick Lauk
Stage 7 La Tropicale Amissa Bongo, Alexander Salby

References

External links

UCI Professional Continental teams
UCI Continental Teams (Europe)
Cycling teams based in Belgium
Cycling teams established in 2011